Terry Obee is a former professional American football player who played wide receiver and kickoff returner for three seasons for the Chicago Bears and Minnesota Vikings.

References

1968 births
American football wide receivers
Chicago Bears players
Minnesota Vikings players
Oregon Ducks football players
Living people
American football return specialists